The Batutulis inscription is an ancient Sunda Kingdom inscription dated 1533, located at Batutulis village, South Bogor, West Java. Batutulis inscription is located in the ancient site of the capital Pakuan Pajajaran, Batutulis means 'inscribed stone', it is this stone, still in situ, which gave name to the village. The complex of Batutulis measures 17 x 15 metres. Several other inscribed stones from Sunda Kingdom also located in this location. The inscription was written in Old Sundanese language. The Batutulis inscriptions were created in 1533 by king Surawisesa to honor and commemorate his late father, the great king Sri Baduga Maharaja (rule 1482 - 1521) or known as Ratu Haji Pakuan Pajajaran Sri Sang Ratu Dewata. Sri Baduga Maharaja is also known in local tradition as King Siliwangi.

Content 
Batutulis inscription has been edited and translated by several scholars, such as Friederich (1853), Karel Frederick Holle (1869), Pleyte (1911), Poerbatjaraka (1921) Noorduyn (1957), and Aditia Gunawan and Arlo Griffiths (2021). The following reading is quoted from Aditia Gunawan and Griffiths' edition:

(1) Ø Ø vaṁ(ṅ) a‹m›(p)un· I(n)i sakakala, pr(ə)bu ratu pura:na pun·, ḍivas·tu

(2) ḍyi, viṅaran· prəbu guru ḍe(va)ta p(ra)n· ḍivas·tu ḍyə ḍiṅaran· sri

(3) baduga maharaja, ratu ha(j)i ḍi pakvan· pajajaran· sri sa‹ṁ› ratu ḍe-

(4) vata pun· ya nu ñusuk· na pakvan· ḍyə Anak· rahyi‹ṁ› ḍeva nis·-

(5) kala, sa‹ṁ› siḍa mok(·)ta ḍi gunuṁ tiga, qə‹ñ›cu rahyiṁ (n)is·kala vas·tu

(6) ka‹ñ›ca:na, saṁ siḍa mok·ta ka nusa laraṁ, ya syi nu (ñ)yin· sakaka-

(7) la, gugun(uṅ)an·, (ṅa)balay·,, ñyin· samiḍa, ñyin· saṁ hyi‹ṁ› talaga [va-]

(8) R̥ na mahavijaya, ya syi pun·,, ØØ I saka, pañca pan·ḍa-

(9) va ṅ(ə)‹m›ban· bumi Ø Ø

Translation 

The English translation quoted here is by Aditia Gunawan and Arlo Griffiths (2021):

Om, pardon [any errors]. This is the memorial of his majesty the former king, inaugurated here with the name Prabu Guru Déwata, (and also) inaugurated here with the name Sri Baduga Maharaja, king of kings in Pakwan Pajajaran, Sri Sang Ratu Déwata. He is the one who demarcated Pakwan here, (being) the child of Rahyang Dewa Niskala, the one who vanished at Gunung Tiga;
grandchild of Rahyang Niskala Wastu Kancana, the one who vanished to Nusa Larang. He, that one, produced the commemoration monument, artificial hill, cladded [it] with stone; he produced the ritual ground (samiḍa); he produced the holy Color Lake. Greatly victorious was he! In the year: “the five Pandawas guard the earth” (i.e. in 1455 Śaka).

Notes

References
Saléh Danasasmita. 2003. Nyukcruk sajarah Pakuan Pajajaran jeung Prabu Siliwangi. Bandung: Kiblat Buku Utama.

Inscriptions in Indonesia
16th-century inscriptions
Sunda Kingdom
1533